The 1987 Missouri Valley Conference men's basketball tournament was played after the conclusion of the 1986–1987 regular season at the Tulsa Convention Center in Tulsa, Oklahoma.

The Wichita State Shockers defeated the Tulsa Golden Hurricane in the championship game, 79-74, and as a result won their 2nd MVC Tournament title and earned an automatic bid to the 1987 NCAA tournament.

Bracket

References

1986–87 Missouri Valley Conference men's basketball season
Missouri Valley Conference men's basketball tournament
Missouri Valley Conference men's basketball tournament